The ancient Egyptian Face hieroglyph, Gardiner sign listed no. D2 is a portrayal of the human face, frontal view.

It is an Egyptian language biliteral with the value hr, ḥr. The sign is also an ideogram for 'face', and related words.

Preposition usage

The Face hieroglyph is used as a preposition, and in preposition constructs. The common meanings for the single face are: in, at, upon, on, by, etc.

See also

Gardiner's Sign List#D. Parts of the Human Body
List of Egyptian hieroglyphs

References

Betrò, 1995. Hieroglyphics: The Writings of Ancient Egypt, Betrò, Maria Carmela, c. 1995, 1996-(English), Abbeville Press Publishers, New York, London, Paris (hardcover)

Budge, 1991.  A Hieroglyphic Dictionary to the Book of the Dead, E.A.Wallace Budge, Dover edition, 1991; Original: c 1911 as: A Hieroglyphic Vocabulary to the Theban Recension of the Book of the Dead with an Index to All the English Equivalents of the Egyptian Words, (Kegan Paul, etc. Ltd, London, publisher). Dover: (softcover)

Schumann-Antelme, and Rossini, 1998. Illustrated Hieroglyphics Handbook, Ruth Schumann-Antelme, and Stéphane Rossini. c 1998, English trans. 2002, Sterling Publishing Co. (Index, Summary lists (tables), selected uniliterals, biliterals, and triliterals.) (softcover)

Egyptian hieroglyphs: parts of the human body

Face